Charles Hopel Brown (born 9 October 1964 at Morant Bay, Saint Thomas Parish, Jamaica), is a US Army veteran and computer engineer. After leaving Robert Lightbourne High School, where he was a member of the cadet corp, he then became a police cadet and later enlisted in the Jamaica Constabulary Force (JCF).

In 1985, he migrated to the United States and enlisted in the United States Army on 18 May 1988 after acquiring legal resident status in February 1988. A 1996 graduate of South Florida State College, he earned an associate degree in computer programming. In August 1996, as part of a negotiated plea agreement with the State of Florida and his attorney at law, Brown pleaded "no contest" to a charge of aggravated battery which stems from a domestic dispute and was placed on two years' probation. The presiding judge withheld the adjudication based on his status in the community.

In August 1998, the probation was extended to August 2001 in order to satisfy the monetary part of the condition of the probation.

On 30 September 1996, the US Congress passed and newly re-elected US President Bill Clinton signed into law the Illegal Immigration Reform and Immigrant Responsibility Act of 1996 (IIRIRA), which lessened the chances of non-US citizens with certain kinds of convictions to remain in the country. An amendment to the IIRIRA categorized probation "as a sentence and a final order of conviction for deportation or removal purposes", so he was able to be deported". However, in 2001, the US Supreme Court in INS v St. Cyr, ruled that non-US citizens with convictions that occurred as a result of plea-agreements and who were not able to be deported at the time of the offence based on the law then in effect should be allowed to file "cancellation of removal" petitions in an effort to remain in the country.

On 5 January 2001, Brown was convicted on one count of resisting arrest without violence by a jury, and sentenced to 9 months in jail. As a result of the conviction, Highlands County Circuit Judge J.D. Langford revoked the probation. Brown was sentenced to a maximum term of 46 months in prison, but was released after 24 months due to good conduct. He was handed over to the Immigration and Customs Enforcement. After appearing before an immigration judge in September 2003, the judge ordered Brown deported to his native Jamaica. Brown was deported on 24 January 2004 after spending a total of 19 years in the United States, altogether. Despite Brown's army service, he had never applied for naturalization, making him eligible for deportation as a non-US citizen.

Brown wrote The Jamaican Deportees....we are displaced, desperate, damaged, rich, resourceful, or dangerous.... Who am I?

He resides in Jamaica and writes frequent published articles to the editor of the Daily Gleaner and The Jamaica Observer.

References

External links
Jamaica-gleaner.com
Jamaica-gleaner.com
Stopdeportationsnow.blogspot.com

1964 births
Living people
People deported from the United States
Jamaican male writers
Jamaican criminals
Jamaican police officers
Jamaican emigrants to the United States
People from Saint Thomas Parish, Jamaica
United States Army soldiers
People convicted of battery